The Charles University Rector election, 2021 was held on 22 October 2021. The incumbent Rector Tomáš Zima was ineligible to run for third term. Milena Králíčková was elected first female rector of the university.

Voting

69 members of academic senate voted. Králíčková received 55 votes to Stehlík's 14 votes.

Notes

2021
Charles University Rector election
Charles University Rector election
Non-partisan elections